Andrea Galliani (born ) is an Italian male volleyball player. He is part of the Italy men's national volleyball team. On club level he plays for Vero Volley.

References

External links
 profile at FIVB.org

1988 births
Living people
People from Desio
Italian men's volleyball players
Volleyball players at the 2015 European Games
European Games competitors for Italy
Mediterranean Games gold medalists for Italy
Mediterranean Games medalists in volleyball
Competitors at the 2013 Mediterranean Games
Sportspeople from the Province of Monza e Brianza